Philopator, meaning "father-loving", was a common royal epithet among Hellenistic monarchs:

 Antiochus X Eusebes Philopator, Seleucid king
 Ariarathes V Eusebes Philopator, King of Cappadocia
 Ariarathes IX Eusebes Philopator, King of Cappadocia
 Ariarathes VI Epiphanes Philopator, King of Cappadocia
 Ariobarzanes II Philopator, King of Cappadocia
 Arsinoe III Philopator, Queen of Egypt
 Cleopatra VII Philopator, Queen of Egypt
 Mithridates IV Philopator Philadelphos, King of Pontus
 Ptolemy IV Philopator, King of Egypt
 Ptolemy VII Neos Philopator, King of Egypt
 Ptolemy XIII Theos Philopator, King of Egypt
 Ptolemy XV Philopator Philometor Caesar, son of Cleopatra VII and Julius Caesar
 Seleucus IV Philopator, Seleucid king
 Strato III Soter Philopator, Indo-Greek king

It can also refer to:

 Philopator I, Roman client king of Cilicia
 Philopator II, Roman client king of Cilicia
 Philopator (moth), a genus of moths in the family Zygaenidae

See also 
 Eupator (disambiguation)
 Philometor (disambiguation)
 Philadelphos (disambiguation)

Ancient Greek titles